Leonard Demi is a member of the Assembly of the Republic of Albania for the Democratic Party of Albania.

References

Living people
Leonard
Democratic Party of Albania politicians
Year of birth missing (living people)
Place of birth missing (living people)
Members of the Parliament of Albania
21st-century Albanian politicians